The 1963 Football League Cup Final, the third to be staged since the competition's inception, was contested between local rivals Birmingham City and Aston Villa over two legs. Aston Villa had won the inaugural competition in 1960–61, and had beaten Birmingham 4–0 in their most recent League meeting, while Birmingham were seeking to win their first major trophy. Birmingham won 3–1 on aggregate, with all the goals coming in the first leg.

Match summary
The first leg took place on 23 May 1963 at Birmingham's home ground, St Andrew's. Birmingham took the lead when Harris fed Auld who crossed for Ken Leek's powerful shot, but Aston Villa equalised via Bobby Thomson. Seven minutes into the second half, the same combination of players made it 2–1, and after 66 minutes Jimmy Bloomfield met a Harris cross to score off the post to give Birmingham a 3–1 lead.
The second leg four days later at Villa Park was goalless. With former England centre half Trevor Smith marking Thomson out of the game and Birmingham's defensive tactics including regularly kicking the ball out for throw-ins, Aston Villa were unable to break their opponents down.

Players and officials

First leg

Second Leg

Road to the final

Birmingham City

Aston Villa

References

External links
League Cup 1963 at rsssf.com

League Cup Final
EFL Cup Finals
League Cup Final 1963
League Cup Final 1963
League Cup Final
Football League Cup Final
1960s in Birmingham, West Midlands